"No Tengo Nada" is a song by Spanish singer Alejandro Sanz. It was released on November 30, 2018 by Universal Music Spain as the lead single from Sanz's twelfth studio album #ElDisco (2019). The song reached the top 10 in Costa Rica and Uruguay.

Music video
The music video of the song was released on 29 November 2018.

Charts

Release history

References

Alejandro Sanz songs
2018 songs
2018 singles
Songs written by Alejandro Sanz
Spanish-language songs
Song recordings produced by Julio Reyes Copello